Gal Levi (born 9 February 1994) is an Israeli footballer who plays as a midfielder for Maccabi Jaffa.

Career

Early career
Levi grew up in the youth departments of Maccabi Tel Aviv and Hapoel Rishon LeZion. On May 3, 2013, 2012–13 season, as a player of the youth team, he made his debut in the senior team uniform in a 0–0 draw against Maccabi Herzliya at Haberfeld Stadium, the Liga Leumit framework. On March 10 he made his second appearance in the league in a 2–2 draw against Maccabi Petah Tikva at HaMoshava Stadium.

In the 2013–14 season, Levi began to establish his position as the senior player in the team, with 32 appearances in the league  this season and scoring one goal. In the 2015–16 season he made his first break, scoring 34 league appearances and scoring seven goals.

On July 20, 2016, in the 2016–17 season, Levi signed with Maccabi Petah Tikva of the Israeli Premier League, for the season with an option for three more seasons. On July 31, he made his debut in the Toto Cup with a 0–1 loss to Maccabi Tel Aviv at the Netanya Stadium. On 21 August, he made his debut in the Israeli Premier League in a 2–2 draw against Beitar Jerusalem in the HaMoshava Stadium. In the winter transfer window, 2017–18 season, he signed with Hapoel Ramat Gan from the Liga Leumit until the end of the season. On January 29, 2018, he made his debut in the league with a 1-2 loss to Hapoel Hadera at Afula Illit Stadium.

On August 2, 2018–19 season, Levi signed with Hapoel Petah Tikva of the Liga Leumit for one season. On August 6 he made his debut in the Toto Cup in a 2–1 win over Hapoel Nir Ramat HaSharon at Grundman Stadium, during which he scored his first goal. On August 27 he made his debut as part of the league in a 2–0 victory over Hapoel Bnei Lod at the Lod Municipal Stadium. In this season, Levi made 34 league appearances and scored 11 goals.

Hapoel Be'er Sheva
On June 4, 2019, the 2019–20 season, Levi signed with Hapoel Be'er Sheva from the Israeli Premier League for three years.

On 21 January 2020 returned to Hapoel Rishon LeZion, as a loan.

Career statistics

References

External links

1994 births
Living people
Israeli footballers
Footballers from Rishon LeZion
Hapoel Rishon LeZion F.C. players
Maccabi Petah Tikva F.C. players
Hapoel Ramat Gan F.C. players
Hapoel Petah Tikva F.C. players
Hapoel Be'er Sheva F.C. players
Beitar Tel Aviv Bat Yam F.C. players
Maccabi Jaffa F.C. players
Liga Leumit players
Israeli Premier League players
Israel youth international footballers
Association football wingers
Association football forwards